Located in Columbia, South Carolina, the Columbia Mets were affiliated with the New York Mets from 1983 to 1992. A member of the South Atlantic League, they became the Capital City Bombers in 1993. They played in Capital City Stadium.

Year by year record

Notable alumni

Alberto Castillo (1990-1991)

Brook Fordyce (1990)

 Bud Harrelson (1985, MGR) 2 x MLB All-Star

Butch Hobson (1987-1988, MGR)

Todd Hundley (1989) 2 x MLB All-Star

 Gregg Jeffries (1985-1986) 2 x MLB All-Star

 Bobby Jones (1991) MLB All-Star

Manny Lee (1984)

Dave Magadan (1983)

Randy Myers (1983) 4 x MLB All-Star

 Pete Schourek (1989)

 Fernando Vina (1990) MLB All-Star

 David West (1986)

Defunct South Atlantic League teams
Baseball teams established in 1983
Sports in Columbia, South Carolina
New York Mets minor league affiliates
1983 establishments in South Carolina
1992 disestablishments in South Carolina
Professional baseball teams in South Carolina
Baseball teams disestablished in 1992
Defunct baseball teams in South Carolina